The Church of San Juan Bautista de San Juan de Coquihuil is a Roman Catholic church located in the Chilean hamlet of San Juan, commune of Dalcahue in Chiloé Island. Commonly referred to as «Church of San Juan» ——, is within the Diocese of Ancud; its construction was finished around 1887.

This church is one of the 16 traditional Chiloé wooden churches built in the 18th and 19th centuries that were declared as a World Heritage site under Churches of Chiloé's denomination because of their unique form of wooden architecture known as the Chilota School of Religious Architecture on Wood.

References 

Architecture in Chile
Wooden churches in Chile
World Heritage Sites in Chile
19th-century Roman Catholic church buildings in Chile
Colonial architecture in Chile
Roman Catholic churches completed in 1887
Churches in Chiloé Archipelago